Viktor Ljung (born 19 April 1991) is a Swedish footballer who plays as a defender.

Career

Club career
Starting his career in Halmstads BK youth system, he was then called up to the senior team in 2010 prior to the match against Djurgårdens IF as Mikael Rosén had come down with sickness, he came on as a substitute in 90th minute of the match.

Ljung left Levanger FK at the end of 2018. On 14 February 2019, Ljung signed with IFK Värnamo for the rest of the season. On 30 November 2019 it was confirmed, that Ljung would return to Halmstads BK for the 2020 season, signing a deal until the end of 2021.

References

External links
HBK Profile 
 
 

1991 births
Living people
Swedish footballers
Association football defenders
Allsvenskan players
Superettan players
Norwegian First Division players
Ettan Fotboll players
Halmstads BK players
Helsingborgs IF players
Levanger FK players
IFK Värnamo players